If I Should Fall to the Field is the second solo album from Steve Von Till of Neurosis. The musical style is quite different from that of Von Till's primary band. It is composed of acoustic based, folkish songs. While mostly original numbers, the album features some traditional songs as well as a Neil Young cover. The album's final track is a 1961 home recording of Steve's grandfather, Louis Von Till, reciting a poem, with instrumentation added by Steve and crew.

Track listing

Personnel

Steve Von Till – guitar, vocals, organ, Hammond B-3, bass, banjo, electronics
Joe Goldman – guitar, drums
Desmond Shea – Hammond B-3, bass
Doug Adams – fiddle
Louis Von Till – vocals on "The Harpy"

2002 albums
Steve Von Till albums
Neurot Recordings albums